Pickworthiidae is a family of small sea snails, marine gastropod molluscs in the superfamily Cerithioidea.

Subfamilies
The following three subfamilies are recognized in the taxonomy of Bouchet & Rocroi (2005):

 Subfamily Pickworthiinae Iredale, 1917 - synonym: Reynellonidae Iredale, 1917
 Subfamily Sherborniinae Iredale, 1917 - synonym: Faxiidae Ravn, 1933
 Subfamily Pelycidiinae Ponder & Hall, 1983: raised to the rank of family Pelycidiidae by Ponder W.F. & Hall S.J. (1983)

Genera 
Genera in the family Pickworthiidae include:

Subfamily Pickworthiinae Iredale, 1917 (synonym: Reynellonidae)
 Ampullosansonia  Kase, 1999
 Astrosansonia Le Renard & Bouchet, 2003
 Chrystella Laseron, 1957
 Clatrosansonia Sabelli & Taviani, 2003
 Cubasansonia Espinosa, Ortea & Fernandez-Garces, 2005
 Discrevinia Laseron, 1957
 Kaseilla Moolenbeek & Hoenselaar, 2010
 Mareleptopoma Moolenbeek & Faber, 1984
 Microliotia Boettger, 1902
 Reynellona Iredale, 1917
 Sansonia Jousseaume, 1892
 Sansoniella Moolenbeek, 2008
 Tinianella Kase, 1999

Subfamily Sherborniinae Iredale, 1917 (synonym: Faxiidae)
 Sherbornia Iredale, 1917

Genera brought into synonymy
 Latilabrum Kuroda & Habe, 1991: synonym of  Microliotia Boettger, 1902
 Mecoliotia Hedley, 1899: synonym of  Sansonia Jousseaume, 1892
 Pickworthia Iredale, 1917: synonym of  Sansonia Jousseaume, 1892

References 

 Jensen, R. H. (1997). A Checklist and Bibliography of the Marine Molluscs of Bermuda. Unp. , 547 pp

External links

Photos of shells